"Every Beat of My Heart" is a rhythm and blues song by Johnny Otis. It was first recorded in 1952 by his group, The Royals (later to be known as The Midnighters).

The Pips recording
In 1961, Gladys Knight & the Pips recorded the song for their debut single on the Vee-Jay label. Credited to The Pips, it was the first of eleven releases by the group to make it to #1 on the US Billboard R&B chart. It was also the group's first top ten on the Billboard Hot 100. "Every Beat of My Heart" was first recorded for the Huntom label, who later sold the master to Vee-Jay Records. At the time of the song's release, The Pips were on the Fury label where they re-recorded the song without piano.  In an unusual occurrence, the Fury recording of the song also made the top twenty on the R&B chart and also made the Hot 100.

Cover version
James Brown recorded an instrumental version of "Every Beat of My Heart" with his band which was released as the B-side of his 1963 single "Like a Baby" and charted #99 on the Billboard Hot 100.

References

1963 singles
Gladys Knight & the Pips songs
James Brown songs
1961 debut singles
Songs written by Johnny Otis
King Records (United States) singles
1954 songs